Chyše is a town in Karlovy Vary District in the Karlovy Vary Region of the Czech Republic. It has about 600 inhabitants.

Administrative parts
Villages of Chýšky, Číhání, Čichořice, Dvorec, Jablonná, Luby, Podštěly, Poříčí, Radotín and Žďárek administrative parts of Chyše.

Geography
It lies on the left bank of the Střela river. The built-up area lies in the eastern tip of the Teplá Highlands, but most of the municipal territory lies in the Rakovník Uplands.

History
The first written mention of Chyše is from 1169, when a fortress was documented here. For 200 years, it was owned by the Lords of Odolenovice.

According to the census of 1921, the town had the population of 1,126. 1,046 were Germans, 72 Czechoslovaks and 8 foreigners. Vast majority of the inhabitants were Roman Catholics, complemented by 20 Jews, six Protestants and three people without religion.

From 1938 to 1945 it was one of the municipalities in Sudetenland. After World War II, the town was returned to Czechoslovakia and the local German population expelled.

Sights
The landmark of the town is the Chyše Castle. The old fortress was rebuilt into a Gothic castle, then it was rebuilt into a Renaissance residence in 1578. The baroque modification took place is 1695–1708. The current appearance is a result of a neo-Gothic reconstruction from 1856–1858. Today the castle is open to the public. A very rare ceiling painting by Petr Brandl on the vault of one of the castle's representative salons dates from 1699.

Notable people
Herbert Zimmermann (born 1944), German neuroscientist

References

External links

Cities and towns in the Czech Republic
Populated places in Karlovy Vary District